The men's marathon at the 1950 European Athletics Championships was held in Brussels, Belgium, on 23 August 1950.

Medalists

Results

Final
23 August

Participation
According to an unofficial count, 22 athletes from 13 countries participated in the event.

 (1)
 (2)
 (2)
 (2)
 (1)
 (2)
 (1)
 (2)
 (2)
 (2)
 (1)
 (2)
 (2)

References

Marathon
Marathons at the European Athletics Championships
Euro
1950 European Athletics
Men's marathons